Doe v. Bolton, 410 U.S. 179 (1973), was a decision of the Supreme Court of the United States overturning the abortion law of Georgia. The Supreme Court's decision was released on January 22, 1973, the same day as the decision in the better-known case of Roe v. Wade.

Background
The Georgia law in question permitted abortion only in cases of rape, severe fetal deformity, or the possibility of severe or fatal injury to the mother. Other restrictions included the requirement that the procedure be approved in writing by three physicians and by a three-member special committee that either (1) continued pregnancy would endanger the pregnant woman's life or "seriously and permanently" injure her health; (2) the fetus would "very likely be born with a grave, permanent and irremediable mental or physical defect"; or (3) the pregnancy resulted from rape or incest. In addition, only Georgia residents could receive abortions under this statutory scheme: non-residents could not have an abortion in Georgia under any circumstances.

The plaintiff, a pregnant woman who was given the pseudonym "Mary Doe" in court papers to protect her identity, sued Arthur K. Bolton, then the Attorney General of Georgia, as the official responsible for enforcing the law in the United States District Court for the Northern District of Georgia. The anonymous plaintiff has since been identified as Sandra Cano, a young mother of three who was nine weeks pregnant at the time the lawsuit was filed. Cano, who died in 2014,  described herself as pro-life and claimed her attorney, Margie Pitts Hames, lied to her in order to have a plaintiff.

Hames claimed that Mrs. Doe had a neurochemical disorder which in her opinion and in the opinion of her physician made it inadvisable to continue her pregnancy. The lawyer claimed that the only way to avoid getting pregnant in the future was for Mr. and Mrs. Doe to abstain from sex. This argument described an ongoing harm to the couple's marital satisfaction in order to prevent judges from dismissing the case as moot once Cano gave birth.

On October 14, 1970, a three-judge panel of the U.S. District Court for the Northern District of Georgia consisting of Northern District of Georgia Judges Albert John Henderson, Sidney Oslin Smith Jr., and Fifth Circuit Court of Appeals Judge Lewis Render Morgan unanimously declared the conditional restrictions portion of the law unconstitutional, though upheld the medical approval and residency requirements. The court also declined to issue an injunction against enforcement of the law, similarly to the district court in the case Roe v. Wade. The plaintiff appealed to the Supreme Court under a statute, since repealed, permitting bypass of the circuit appeals court.

The oral arguments and re-arguments followed the same schedule as those in Roe. Atlanta attorney Hames represented Doe at the hearings, while Georgia assistant attorney general Dorothy Toth Beasley represented Bolton.

Opinion of the Court
The same 7–2 majority that struck down a Texas abortion law in Roe v. Wade invalidated most of the remaining restrictions of the Georgia abortion law, including the medical approval and residency requirements. The Court reiterated the protected "right to privacy," which applied to matters involving marriage, procreation, contraception, family relationships, child rearing, and education. Justice Harry A. Blackmun wrote the majority opinion for the Court, in which he explained "the sensitive and emotional nature" of the issue and "the deep and seemingly absolute convictions" on both sides. Justice Blackmun went on to conclude that as a constitutional matter, the right to privacy was "broad enough to encompass a woman's decision whether or not to terminate her pregnancy."

Together, Doe and Roe declared abortion as a constitutional right and overturned most laws against abortion in other U.S. states. Roe legalized abortion nationwide for approximately the first six months of pregnancy until the point of fetal viability.

Definition of health
The Court's opinion in Doe v. Bolton stated that a woman may obtain an abortion after viability, if necessary to protect her health.  The Court defined "health" as follows:

Subsequent developments

The records for Doe concerning Cano were sealed until 1988, when Cano had them unsealed in order to answer questions she had about the case. After abortion rights advocates found out about Cano's legal and political actions, her car was shot at and vandalized with graffiti, and someone shot at her while she was on her front porch holding her baby grandchild.

In 2003, Sandra Cano filed a motion to re-open the case claiming that she had not been aware that the case had been filed on her behalf and that if she had known she would not have supported the litigation.  The district court denied her motion, and she appealed.  When the appeals court also denied her motion, she requested review by the United States Supreme Court.  However, the Supreme Court declined to hear Sandra Cano's suit to overturn the ruling. Sandra Cano died on September 30, 2014.

See also
Canadian Supreme Court case of R. v. Morgentaler finding Canada's abortion law unconstitutional
German Federal Constitutional Court abortion decision
List of United States Supreme Court cases, volume 410

References

External links
Written opinions
 
 
 
Oral transcripts
 Audio of oral arguments, oyez.org, transcripts accompany the audio
 Transcript of First Oral Argument in Doe v. Bolton, 410 U.S. 179 (1973), aul.org, edited September 2011
 Transcript of Reargument in Doe v. Bolton, 410 U.S. 179 (1973), aul.org, edited September 2011

Other media
Case file for Lewis Powell, memos and annotated copies for Doe v. Bolton and Roe v. Wade, law.wlu.edu
United States Senate Committee of the Judiciary Testimony of Sandra Cano
Attorney General Arthur Bolton with Governor Jimmy Carter, 1972, photo taken December 1972, Digital Collections, Georgia State University Library

American Civil Liberties Union litigation
Medical lawsuits
Right to abortion under the United States Constitution
Right to privacy under the United States Constitution
United States abortion case law
United States privacy case law
United States substantive due process case law
United States Supreme Court cases
United States Supreme Court cases of the Burger Court
Void for vagueness case law
1973 in United States case law
History of women in Georgia (U.S. state)